Stigmatomma groehni is an extinct species of ant in the genus Stigmatomma. It was described by Dlussky in 2009, where it was found in the Baltic Amber, alongside another extinct species Stigmatomma electrinum.

References

†
Fossil taxa described in 2009
Fossil ant taxa
Prehistoric insects of Europe
Eocene insects